The 14673 / 14674 Amritsar–Jaynagar Shaheed Express is an Express train belonging to Indian Railways – Northern Railway zone that runs between  and  in India.

It operates as train number 14674 from Amritsar Junction to Jaynagar and as train number 14673 in the reverse direction, serving the states of Punjab, Haryana, Delhi, Uttar Pradesh and Bihar.

Coaches
The 14674 / 73 Amritsar–Jaynagar Shaheed Express has 1 AC 3 tier, 7 sleeper class, 8 general unreserved and 2 SLR (Seating cum Luggage Rake) coaches. It does not carry a pantry car.

As is customary with most train services in India, the coach composition may be amended at the discretion of Indian Railways depending on demand.

Service

As the average speed of the train is below , as per Indian Railway rules, its fare does not include a Superfast surcharge.

Routeing

Traction
As sections of the route are fully electrified, a Ghaziabad-based WAP-5 / WAP-7 locomotive hauls the train from Amritsar Junction to Jaynagar and vice versa.

Operation
14674 Amritsar–Jaynagar Shaheed Express runs from Amritsar Junction every Thursday, Friday & Sunday reaching Jaynagar on the 3rd day.

14673 Jaynagar–Amritsar Shaheed Express runs from Jaynagar every Wednesday, Thursday & Saturday reaching Amritsar Junction on the next day.

See also 

 Jaynagar railway station
 Amritsar Junction railway station
 Saryu Yamuna Express

References

External links

Transport in Jainagar
Transport in Amritsar
Named passenger trains of India
Rail transport in Punjab, India
Rail transport in Haryana
Rail transport in Bihar
Rail transport in Uttar Pradesh
Express trains in India